Iggy is a masculine given name or nickname. It may also refer to:

 Tropical Cyclone Iggy, in the 2011–12 Australian region cyclone season
 St. Ignatius College Prep, a Chicago, Illinois, secondary school occasionally referred to as "Iggy"
 Iggy's, a fine dining restaurant in Singapore
 Italian Greyhound, a breed of dog, often abbreviated as "I.G." or "Iggy"

See also

 
 IGY (disambiguation)